The Summit School is a state approved, private special education day school in Queens, New York, United States. Established in 1968, it operates two sites near the St. John's University campus; the Lower School, which educates elementary and middle school students, utilizes space in the Hillcrest Jewish Center, and the Upper School serves high school students in Jamaica Estates.

In contrast to most private schools, which are independently operated, Summit is tuition-free and accepts students from all five boroughs of New York City, as well as from Westchester, Nassau, and Suffolk counties.

Summit is also considered to be a well-regarded school for students with learning disabilities, and it has a highly competitive student and faculty enrollment process.

History 
The Summit School of Queens, New York was founded by Hershel Stiskin in 1968 as a charter school for children and adolescents with a wide array of special needs. When Stiskin moved to Israel in 1972, his brother, Mayer and sister-in-law Ninette—founders of Summit's residential center in Nyack, which is also affiliated with the school, as well as Summit Camp & Travel—oversaw the management before Howard Adams and then-Lower School principal Judith Gordon, Ph.D. proceeded as directors, respectively.

Over the course of two decades, Gordon revised the school into a state approved, tuition-free private school for bright students with mild learning disabilities, and the school further maintained its status as one of the most prestigious special education institutions in the United States. Under Gordon's leadership, she enforced a more vigorous curriculum, expanded its clinical counseling services, as well as the assistant teacher ratio, decided to have "students in each class [be compatible with] each other", and appointed Emily Seltzer  to develop the school's top pre-vocational, job training program in the country, which Seltzer ran for many years until her death in 2010. Gordon retired in 2008, but earned the honorary title of director emeritus. 

Former associate director John Renner became the director and Upper School principal, with Richard Sitman as executive director, in association with the residential school in Nyack, prior to their retirements in 2017 and 2021, respectively.

Enrollment history
According to a section of New York Magazine in late 2003, the school had the highest amount of student admission forms received—more than 1,000—in the city among the leading "special schools for special kids", with only 35 spaces available.

School structure

Program
Students attending the school are in grades 3-12, who have average to above average IQs, but mild learning disabilities, such as attention deficit/hyperactivity disorder, high functioning autism, dyslexia, Tourette syndrome, or other specific learning challenges. The school employs a faculty of 150 professionals, including a student to teacher-assistant to teacher ratio of 12 to 1.5 to 1, and a staff of social workers, speech and occupational therapists, reading specialists, and 1 to 1 aides as needed. They "focus on the academic, social, emotional, and prevocational development of each child" by providing full therapeutic support in the classroom, as well as in individual and small group settings.

When assigning students into their homeroom classes, "age, IQ range, [written] language facility, management needs, prior friendships, and personality traits [are taken into consideration]". English and mathematics vary considerably in classroom size from 3-12 students depending on their learning style; these subjects are taught strategy-based and through hands-on learning with manipulatives in place. Other courses taught at the school are history, science, world languages, art, music, computers, swimming instruction, and physical education.

Summit administers a schoolwide positive behavior support (PBS) and contingency contracting program that is reinforced through the use of point cards, a daily index card students receive entailing their individualized contract—or behavioral goal—and marked scorings for "On Time", "In Area", "Work", "Homework", "Behavior", and "Contract" during each period. Students who maintain consistently high points receive approval into the school's Honor Code program in which they have the opportunity to participate in specialized day trips and outings. The Lower School also implements a prize-based contingency management program with a school store in place where students can select prizes based on the number of points they earn.

High school students participate in a work-based learning program; they work as interns at businesses involved in the program. Freshmen, sophomores, and juniors are assigned to work in the morning once per week where they are given ongoing support from their job coaches, while seniors choose their placement sites, travel independently, and work the entire school day on Fridays. The guidance counselor also helps students discover potential career aspirations and assists with their future college planning or other post-secondary endeavors.

Current administration and supervising faculty
Allison Edwards and Karen Frigenti are the directors; they also serve as principals of the Upper and Lower Schools, respectively. Nancy Morgenroth is the director of admissions and speech and language services, with Tina Rosenbaum, Ed.D. as director of educational services by coordinating the curriculum and classroom placements. The assistant principal of the Upper School is Elizabeth Breland, and Dennis Moeller has the same position in the Lower School. 

Long-served Lower School clinic director Sherri Bordoff moved to the Upper School and currently oversees their clinical faculty, with Lacy Ostrander, who was a social worker in the Lower School for a number of years, taking over her prior role as senior social worker. Tara Pino has been the director of the Upper School's work-based learning program since 2019.

Enrollment
The Summit School has approximately 300 students enrolled annually.

Admission process
Parents are required to fill out an application form, provide their childs' individualized education plan, neurological and  psychological evaluations, social history, current report card, school transcript and prior records, as well as "any other relevant material that will add to [the school's] understanding of the applicant."

Appointments are also scheduled to visit the school, which are overseen by the admissions director. If the student is not accepted into the school, the admissions director will refer them to different schools. For the students who are accepted, their parents are obligated to sign a contract for "approval of funding from the New York City Department of Education or [their] local school district."

Extra-curricular activities
The school features a student government and offers a host of extra-curricular activities, including after school enrichment programs, band, fine art, and a basketball team. Summit also sponsors annual career assemblies, and evening workshops for parents that are conducted by guest lecturers.

School newspaper
The Summit Sun, currently published every other Friday, is the school's official newspaper. The paper was founded in January 2010, and is primarily student organized, which discusses school activities, sports, current events, and opinion pieces.

References 

1968 establishments in New York City
Educational institutions established in 1968
Private elementary schools in Queens, New York
Private high schools in Queens, New York
Private middle schools in Queens, New York
Special schools in the United States